The Nokia N86 8MP is a high-end smartphone with emphasis on the camera. It was announced on 17 February 2009 and released in May 2009 as part of the Nseries. It runs on Symbian OS 9.3 (S60 3rd Edition FP2) and shares similar design features with the N97. Its name references the camera's megapixel count.

Camera 
One of its main selling points is its Carl Zeiss photography features. It was Nokia's first camera phone to have an 8 megapixel sensor (although late compared to other manufacturers), and features both multiple aperture settings and a mechanical shutter (uncommon features by the standards of camera phones), and a Carl Zeiss lens with a wide angle of view (28 mm equivalent). It also has auto focus and a dual LED flash (3rd generation dual-LEDs), and an AF assist light. Video capture resolution is 640 × 480 pixels (VGA) at 30 frames per second.

The variable aperture adjusts between the three levels of 2.4, 3.2 and 4.8, depending on lighting conditions.

Design 
The N86 utilises the dual-sliding form factor of the Nokia N95 and N85, whilst adding a toughened glass front cover and metal detailing and keypad, providing a premium look and feel. It has a 2.6-inch AMOLED display, a fast 434 MHz processor, and 8GB of internal memory. The Nokia N86 also features the same kickstand as the N85, and so it is possible to use as a small standalone screen, as well as configuring the opening of the stand to launch applications such as the video player. It also supports the N-Gage gaming platform. The N86 8MP is regarded as the spiritual successor of the N95 8GB due to its feature set in the same sliding form factor, and the commercial failure of the N96. Some regard it a successor of the N82 due to its camera.

Features
The N86 8MP is a 3.5G or 3.75G(3GPP)device with dual-band HSDPA support, quad-band GSM and Wi-Fi. It has an A-GPS receiver, which links into location-based services via Nokia Maps, and photographs can be automatically geo-tagged. There is also a built-in digital compass, an FM radio, and there is also an FM transmitter. It is rated to give 6 hours talktime, 25 hours music playback and 11 days on standby on a full charge.

Digital TV 
With optional DVB-H Nokia Mobile TV Receiver SU-33W it is possible to watch television on the screen of the phone.

Free navigation
Ovi Maps 3.03, with free navigation, was released on 17 March 2010 for the Nokia N86. The new version was available via the SW Update application and has a file size of 8.24 MB. The N86, E72, E55, E52, 6730, 6710 (S60 3rd Edition Feature Pack 2) and all of Nokia's Symbian^1 (S60 5th Edition) devices will get to experience beta-testing and free navigation.

Firmware updates

6 July 2009  
The Nokia N86 8MP received a big firmware upgrade, to v11.043. That brought official Ovi Store compatibility (with Ovi web site shortcut and option to download the dedicated client), camera tweaks and the usual early firmware bug fixes and improvements.

30 September 2009 
The Nokia N86 8MP received its v20 firmware upgrade a full week or so ahead of schedule. It was 8 MB large for an Over The Air (OTA) update.

Some significant changes were: Improved still image and video quality and Close-up focus, Face detection (indicated by a yellow square) and Red-eye removal were added, New focus point indication (shows where in the scene the camera is focusing).

11 January 2010 
The Nokia N86 8MP got a minor update to v21 firmware. Version 21.006 replaced v20.115 and was a maintenance release, improving performance further and fixing a number of minor bugs.

15 April 2010 
Version 30.009 firmware mainly features the latest Ovi Maps client and is now available via Nokia Software Update (142 MB) and Over The Air (5085 KB).

It includes the latest Ovi Maps 3.03 (with free navigation), the sharing of location via Facebook. RealPlayer interface is tweaked (no more d-pad problem while playing videos) and there are some usual minor fixes and improvements.

20 May 2010 
It includes the latest Ovi Maps 3.04. The new version adds formal support for WiFi as a positioning method as part of an overhaul of the positioning functionality, plus significant performance improvements for search, zooming and map panning, a number of consumer-friendly UI tweaks and the addition of Qype information to the places database.

N87
The Nokia N87, a successor of the N86, was leaked on the internet with full specifications in December 2009 and then again in early 2010. However it was never released, and instead the touchscreen Nokia N8 was introduced. In November 2010 a prototype of the N87 appeared on eBay which shows it running probably Symbian^3. The listing was removed after some time by the seller. Nokia would never release another high-end non-touchscreen device after the N86 8MP.

References

External links

Official N86 8MP website
MWC 2009 photo gallery
Some rare collection of various reviews related to n86 and its camera
Time lapse treat- nokia conversations

Nokia Nseries
Mobile phones introduced in 2009
Mobile phones with user-replaceable battery
Slider phones